Basterotia is a genus of small white bivalves in the family Basterotiidae.

This genus has a cosmopolitan distribution.

Species
 Basterotia angulata (H. Adams, 1871)
 † Basterotia aquitanica Cossmann & Peyrot, 1914 
 Basterotia arcula Melvill, 1898
 † Basterotia biali Cossmann & Peyrot, 1909 
 Basterotia borbonica (Deshayes in Maillard, 1863)
 Basterotia californica Durham, 1950
 Basterotia carinata Goto, Hamamura & Kato, 2011
 Basterotia clancula Cosel, 1995
 Basterotia corbuloidea Dall, 1899
 † Basterotia corbuloides M. Hörnes, 1859 
 Basterotia elliptica (Recluz, 1850)
 Basterotia floridana Dall, 1903
 Basterotia gouldi (A. Adams, 1864)
 Basterotia lutea (Dall, Bartsch & Rehder, 1938)
 Basterotia maillardi (Deshayes in Maillard, 1863)
 Basterotia obliqua Coan, 1999
 Basterotia oblonga E. A. Smith, 1890
 Basterotia obtusa G. B. Sowerby III, 1894
 Basterotia panamica Coan, 1999
 Basterotia peninsularis (Jordan, 1936)
 Basterotia pustula Nowell-Usticke, 1971
 Basterotia quadrata (Hanley, 1843)
 Basterotia recluzi (A. Adams, 1864)
 Basterotia stimpsoni (A. Adams, 1864)
 Basterotia subalata (Gatliff & Gabriel, 1910)
 Basterotia tricostalis G. B. Sowerby III, 1897
Synonyms
 Basterotia angulata (S. V. Wood, 1857): synonym of Basterotina angulata (S. V. Wood, 1857)
 Basterotia caledonica (P. Fischer, 1886): synonym of Basterotia angulata (H. Adams, 1871)
 Basterotia dubia (Lamy, 1925): synonym of Basterotia angulata (H. Adams, 1871)
 Basterotia ecuadoriana Olsson, 1961: synonym of Basterotia peninsularis (E. K. Jordan, 1936)
 Basterotia hertleini Durham, 1950: synonym of Basterotia peninsularis (E. K. Jordan, 1936)
 Basterotia spaldingi (Jousseaume in Lamy, 1925): synonym of Basterotia arcula Melvill, 1898
 Basterotia trapezium Yokoyama, 1920: synonym of Paramya recluzi (A. Adams, 1864): synonym of Basterotia recluzi (A. Adams, 1864)

References

 Olsson A.A. & Harbison A. (1953). Pliocene Mollusca of southern Florida with special reference to those from North Saint Petersburg. Monographs of the Academy of Natural Sciences of Philadelphia. 8: 1-457, pls. 1-65.
 Coan, E. V.; Valentich-Scott, P. (2012). Bivalve seashells of tropical West America. Marine bivalve mollusks from Baja California to northern Peru. 2 vols, 1258 pp.

External links
 Hörnes M. (1859). [Charaktere eines neuen Bivalven-Geschlechtes. Verhandlungen des Zoologisch-Botanischen Vereins in Wien. 9: 71-72]
  Récluz, C. A. (1850). Monographie d'un nouveau genre de coquilles bivalves, G. Eucharis. Journal de Conchyliologie. 1(2): 164-169
 Gray, J. E. (1842). Molluscs. Pp. 48-92, in: Synopsis of the contents of the British Museum, edition 44. British Museum. London. iv + 308 p
 Goto, R.; Hamamura, Y.; Kato, M. (2011). Morphological and ecological adaptation of Basterotia bivalves (Galeommatoidea: Sportellidae) to symbiotic association with burrowing echiuran worms. Zoological Science. 28 (3): 225-234

Bivalve genera
Bivalves